"Perfidia" (Spanish for "perfidy", meaning faithlessness, treachery or betrayal) is a 1939 Spanish-language song written by Mexican composer and arranger Alberto Domínguez (1906–1975). The song is sung from the perspective of a man whose lover has left him. The song has also been recorded in English (with lyrics by Milton Leeds) and as an instrumental.

Recordings
The song became a hit for Xavier Cugat on the Victor label in 1940.
In late 1960, a rock instrumental version of "Perfidia" was released by the Ventures, which rose to number 15 on the Billboard chart. The record was a Top 10 hit on a number of popular music radio stations, including KYA in San Francisco, KLIF Dallas, KOL Seattle, KDWB Minneapolis, WHK Cleveland, KIMN Denver, and KISN Portland. The record topped out at number 11 on the charts of WLS Chicago, and WIBG Philadelphia.

Other recordings
"Perfidia" has been recorded by many artists, including:
Anne Shelton 
Laurel Aitken
Dave Apollon 
Juan Arvizu 
Andrea Bocelli
Brave Combo
Ray Conniff 
Café Tacuba
Chico Che
Nat King Cole
Crveni Koralji
Xavier Cugat 
Issac Delgado
Phyllis Dillon
Arielle Dombasle
Freddy Fender
Ibrahim Ferrer
The Four Aces
A version by Carlos Garcia, a one-armed Mexican street performer originally from Michoacán, who makes music by blowing on the side of an ivy leaf, and recorded on a sidewalk, was featured on a CD, Sinfonia Urbana. It was overdubbed with strings by the Kronos Quartet for their 2002 album Nuevo.
Benny Goodman
Ben E. King
Dorothy Lamour
James Last
Julie London
Trini Lopez
Los Panchos
Los Rabanes 
Los Straitjackets
Los Tres Caballeros and Javier Solís (in Spanish)
Luis Miguel
Glenn Miller
Olivia Molina
Hugo Montenegro
VIS Limunada (in Serbo-Croatian)
Sara Montiel
Nana Mouskouri
Lupita Palomera
Charlie Parker
María Dolores Pradera (in Spanish)
Perez Prado
An English arrangement of "Perfidia" was also the founding song of the Princeton Nassoons, Princeton University's oldest a cappella group.
Elvira Quintana
Elvira Ríos
Linda Ronstadt (in Spanish and English) 
Andy Russell
Alfredo Sadel
The Shadows (with and not with Cliff Richard)
Carola Standertskjöld
Mel Tormé
René Touzet
King Tubby
The Ventures
Olavi Virta 
Lawrence Welk
Najwa Nimri

In popular culture 
 Desi Arnaz sings the Spanish version in the 1941 film Father Takes a Wife which starred Gloria Swanson.
 'Perfidia' is the title to a chapter of Nora Johnson's 1986 novel Tender Offer. The song highlights the theme of the story's zenith and the actual song is described being played during a crucial scene.
 'Perfidia' is the title of a section of Peter Nichols's 2015 novel The Rocks. Several references are made to the song.
 Perfidia is the title of the acclaimed 1997 novel by Judith Rossner. The song lyrics are quoted several times in the narrative.
 Perfidia is the name of a James Ellroy novel (2014).
 Perfidia is a song in the Off-Broadway musical Forever Plaid (1990).
 The song has also been used as the theme music to the Canadian animated television series George and Martha.
 Perfidia was also included on the Dexter soundtrack.
 Linda Ronstadt's version of the song in English with a Spanish introduction was used in the 1992 film The Mambo Kings. Ronstadt also recorded the song in Spanish for her 1992 album Frenesí. At the 9th Lo Nuestro Awards, her version received a nomination for Tropical Song of the Year.
 In Casablanca, Perfidia plays while the characters Rick Blaine and Ilsa Lund are ballroom dancing during the famous "flashback to Paris" sequence.
The song is heard in Now, Voyager, in a scene where Jerry (Paul Henreid) and Charlotte (Bette Davis) are dancing.
 Perfidia is also used in the first-season episode of the Netflix series Sense8 
 In Miguel Gomes' 2015 film Arabian Nights different versions of the song are used over the opening credits of each of the film's three volumes, featuring those by Phyllis Dillon, Nat King Cole and Glenn Miller, as well as another by one of the film's performers Crista Alfaiate.
 In the film The Mask of Dimitrios, a 1944 film directed by Jean Negulesco, Perfidia plays in a bar scene.
 Wong Kar-wai uses  Xavier Cugat's version in his films Days of Being Wild and 2046. Nat King Cole's version appears on the soundtrack for In the Mood for Love.
The song is featured in the 2019 film Live Twice, Love Once.

References 

Spanish-language songs
1939 songs
Pop standards
Benny Goodman songs
The Four Aces songs
The Ventures songs
Songs written by Alberto Domínguez
Trio Los Panchos songs
Boleros
Linda Ronstadt songs
Luis Miguel songs